Sébastien Flute (born 25 March 1972 in Brest, Brittany) is a gold medal winning French archer. He currently has the 25th best ranking in the world among archers. He won the gold medal in the Men's Individual competition in the 1992 Summer Olympics, the 20-year-old European champion defeated all three South Korean archers on his way to the Olympic Title; and also competed in the 1996 Olympic Games and the 2000 Olympic Games. He retired from International competition after the 2000 Sydney Olympics.

In 2009 he came out of retirement, hoping to gain a place at the London 2012 Olympics. However, on 17 March 2012 he announced that he had not been selected and that he was returning to retirement.

Since February 2022, he serves as archery sports manager for the 2024 Summer Olympics and the 2024 Summer Paralympics to be held in Paris, France.

References

External links
Player profile
 Official Blog
 

1972 births
Archers at the 1992 Summer Olympics
Archers at the 1996 Summer Olympics
Archers at the 2000 Summer Olympics
French male archers
Living people
Olympic archers of France
Olympic gold medalists for France
Recipients of the Legion of Honour
Olympic medalists in archery
Medalists at the 1992 Summer Olympics